John Trelawney may refer to:

Squire John Trelawney
John Trelawny (disambiguation)